Reborn is the fourth album by the Christian metal band Living Sacrifice. The album was released in 1997, and later re-released and remastered in 2004. In 2020, the band announce a vinyl re-release of Reborn, which sold out quickly.

Critical reception 
Reborn saw a drastic separation from their previous style, dropping most of the death metal sound of Nonexistent and Inhabit, in favor of more of a metalcore and hardcore punk sound. The album was well-received by the metalcore and hardcore scene, whereas the death metal scene predominantly disregarded it. The album is widely considered as Living Sacrifice's biggest album.

Stephen Thomas Erwine of AllMusic wrote "...the average metal fan will find much here of interest, particularly the pummeling riffs and shredding solos." Fred Keel of Jesus Freak Hideout stated "Reborn is a Christian metal masterpiece recommended for fans of Demon Hunter and Becoming the Archetype." Alex Figgis of Cross Rhythms, for the review of the original Reborn album, gave 10/10 and reported "They leave the listener in no doubt as to their heartfelt desire to share the gospel with those who have ears to hear; tacking the wisdom of the world head on with the seemingly foolishness "I God in Christ, with us much subtlety as a sledge hammer." Tony Cummings, also of Cross Rhythms reviewing the reissue, also gave the album 10/10. "For more enlightened hard rock lovers, here's a chance to hear again a Christian hard music classic in all its brutal glory and catch that master guitarist, Jason Truby, in pre-P.O.D. days, in the process." There were also several reviews from Cornerstone Magazine, Garlic Press, HM Magazine, 7Ball, and YouthWorker.

Track listing

Personnel 

Living Sacrifice

 Bruce Fitzhugh - vocals, rhythm guitar 
 Jason Truby - lead guitar, backing vocals
 Chris Truby - bass guitar
 Lance Garvin - drums, percussion

Production

 Barry Poynter - recording, engineer, mixing
 Brandon Ebel - executive producer
 Shuji Kobayashi - layout concept, cover concept, photography
 Claire - layout

References 

Living Sacrifice albums
1997 albums
Solid State Records albums